Harry Atkinson (1831–1892) was a New Zealand Premier.

Harry Atkinson may also refer to:
Harry Atkinson (baseball) (1874–1953), American baseball player
Harry Atkinson (cricketer) (1881–1959), English cricketer
Harry Atkinson (physicist) (1929–2018), New Zealand-born British physicist and science administrator
Harry Atkinson (RAF officer) (born ), British Royal Air Force officer
Harry Atkinson (rugby union) (1888–1949), New Zealand rugby union player
Harry Atkinson (socialist) (1867–1956), New Zealand engineer, socialist and insurance agent
Harry E. Atkinson (1920–2001), mayor of Newport News, Virginia
Harry Atkinson (bowls), South African lawn bowler

See also
Harold Atkinson (disambiguation)
Henry Atkinson (disambiguation)